Yvonne Daldossi (born 26 January 1992) is an Italian speed skater. She was born in Merano. She competed at the 2013 World Sprint Speed Skating Championships, and at the 2014 Winter Olympics in Sochi, in 500 meters.

References

External links

1992 births
Italian female speed skaters
Speed skaters at the 2014 Winter Olympics
Speed skaters at the 2018 Winter Olympics
Olympic speed skaters of Italy
Sportspeople from Merano
Living people
Speed skaters of Centro Sportivo Carabinieri